Mammut Sports Group AG is a Swiss multinational mountaineering and trekking company headquartered in Seon, Switzerland. The company was founded in 1862 by Kaspar Tanner in Dintikon. Until 2021, Mammut belonged to Conzzeta AG (now known as Bystronic AG), at which point they were sold to Telemos Capital. Amongst others, Raichle (mountain and trekking shoes), Ajungilak (sleeping bags) and Toko (ski wax) belong to Mammut Sports Group.

In 2011, Mammut obtained a sales volume of 210.8 million CHF. Mammut has about 200 employees at its headquarters and runs many establishments all over the world. The central repository for Europe is in Memmingen, Germany, which has been expanded several times.

Raichle
In April 2003, Mammut purchased Raichle, from Austrian owners Kneissl, although Raichle had originally been founded in Kreuzlingen, Switzerland.

While Raichle had been making boots for about 100 years, former Raichle products are now marketed as Mammut.

In December 2019, Conzetta Holding published its intention to divest its sporting goods division. In April 2021, it was announced that Mammut would be sold to London-based investment company Telemos Capital, which is backed by Philippe Jacobs of the former Jacobs coffee dynasty.

References

External links
 

Outdoor clothing brands
Manufacturing companies of Switzerland
Companies established in 1862
Ski equipment manufacturers
Camping equipment manufacturers
Climbing and mountaineering equipment companies
Swiss brands